The 39th New York State Legislature, consisting of the New York State Senate and the New York State Assembly, met from January 30 to April 17, 1816, during the ninth year of Daniel D. Tompkins's governorship, in Albany.

Background
Under the provisions of the New York Constitution of 1777, amended by the Constitutional Convention of 1801, 32 senators were elected on general tickets in the four senatorial districts for four-year terms. They were divided into four classes, and every year eight Senate seats came up for election. Assemblymen were elected countywide on general tickets to a one-year term, the whole Assembly being renewed annually.

In 1797, Albany was declared the State capital, and all subsequent Legislatures have been meeting there ever since. In 1799, the Legislature enacted that future Legislatures meet on the last Tuesday of January of each year unless called earlier by the governor.

State Senator Elbert H. Jones resigned on March 6, 1815, due to ill health, leaving a vacancy in the Southern District.

On April 8, 1815, the Legislature re-apportioned the Assembly districts, increasing the total number of assemblymen from 112 to 126. Genesee; Onondaga; Ontario and Seneca gained two seats each. Allegany & Steuben; Cattaraugus, Chautauqua & Niagara; Cayuga; Otsego; Rensselaer and Schoharie gained one seat each.

On April 17, 1815, the Legislature re-apportioned the Senate districts, to take effect in May 1815: Dutchess, Putnam and Rockland Co. (and 1 seat) were transferred from the Middle to the Southern District; Albany Co. from the Eastern, and Chenango, Otsego and Schoharie Co. from the Western (and 3 seats) were transferred to the Middle District; Herkimer, Jefferson, Lewis and St. Lawrence Co. (and 3 seats) were transferred from the Western to the Eastern District.

At this time the politicians were divided into two opposing political parties: the Federalists and the Democratic-Republicans.

Elections
The State election was held from April 25 to 27, 1815.

Since the re-apportionment of the Senate districts had been enacted only a week before, and should take effect only in May 1815, the senators were elected under the previous apportionment. Peter R. Livingston, Isaac Ogden (both Middle D.), Henry J. Frey, Ralph Hascall, Abraham Van Vechten (all three Eastern D.), Henry Seymour, Stephen Bates (both Western D.); and Assemblyman David Allen (Eastern D.) were elected to full terms in the Senate. Jacob Barker (Southern D.) was elected to fill the vacancy. Allen, Frey, Hascall and Van Vechten were Federalists, the other five were Democratic-Republicans.

63 Democratic-Republicans and 63 Federalists were declared elected to the Assembly.

Sessions
The Legislature met at the Old State Capitol in Albany on January 30, 1816, but assembled a quorum only on the next day when 123 assemblymen appeared, one had died and two were sick.

On January 31, Daniel Cruger (Dem.-Rep.) was elected Speaker with 61 votes against 60 for Jacob R. Van Rensselaer (Fed.), tradition had it that the candidates did not vote for themselves. Aaron Clark (Dem.-Rep.) was then re-elected Clerk of the Assembly with 62 votes against 59 for James Van Ingen (Fed.), one blank vote was cast and the Speaker did not vote except in case of a tie. The Assembly had thus a Democratic-Republican majority of one vote, 62 to 61.

Right after Speaker and Clerk had been elected, William Alexander Duer (Fed.) presented a petition on behalf of Henry Fellows (Fed.) to contest the election of Peter Allen (Dem.-Rep.) in Ontario County. Fellows had received 3,725 votes, including 49 votes cast in the Town of Perrington. Allen had received 3,695. Although the 49 Perrington votes had been cast for "Henry Fellows", and the election inspectors had filed the result thus with the Town Clerk, a copy returning the votes for "Hen. Fellows" was forwarded to the County Clerk who counted these votes as scattering, since it was not a perfect match with the other votes returned for "Henry Fellows". Without the 49 Perrington votes, Allen had a majority of 19 and was certified as elected. Seating Fellows in place of Allen was inevitable, and gave the Federalists a majority of one vote, but the Democratic-Republicans decided to put it off until after the election of the Council of Appointment.

When Duer's petition was put to a vote, John H. Beach (Dem.-Rep.) moved to postpone it until the next day. Duer objected, saying that the motion was not in order. Speaker Daniel Cruger (Dem.-Rep.) ruled that the motion was indeed in order. Thomas J. Oakley (Fed.) appealed the Speaker's ruling, and a viva voce vote was called on this appeal. When the Clerk prepared to call the roll, Duer moved that Peter Allen not be allowed to vote, since he was directly interested in the issue. The Speaker ruled that this motion was not in order. This ruling was appealed also, and a vote was called on this question. It was then moved that Peter Allen had no right to vote on this question, and the Speaker ruled that Allen had the right, which ruling was then appealed again. Then the Assembly adjourned.

On February 1, the Assembly re-elected the Sergeant-at-Arms and Doorkeeper of the previous session, and informed the Senate that the Assembly was organized and ready for business. Governor Daniel D. Tompkins (Dem.-Rep.) informed that he would address the Legislature with his annual message on the next day, and the Assembly adjourned. On February 2, the governor's message was read, and the Assembly adjourned.

On February 3, the question of the contested seat was taken up again. Henry Leavenworth (Dem.-Rep.) offered a resolution to elect "immediately" a Council of Appointment. Answering that, James Lynch (Fed.) offered a resolution that the election of the Council be postponed until after the decision of the question of the contested seat. The Speaker ruled that Lynch's resolution was not in order, which was confirmed by a vote of the Assembly. Oakley then moved to amend Leavenworth's resolution, changing "immediately" to "on Wednesday next, and that in the meantime, the house would consider the right of Peter Allen to his seat". A vote on this amendment was called, and Peter A. Jay (Fed.) moved to exclude Peter Allen from the vote. The Speaker ruled that this motion was not in order, which ruling was appealed by Oakley, and the Assembly adjourned.

On February 5, the struggle continued. Duer moved that Peter Allen not be allowed to vote on Oakley's appeal. The Speaker ruled that Duer's motion was not in order, which was appealed by Duer himself. A vote was called, and the Assembly voted 61 to 61 (included Peter Allen's vote), and the Speaker voted in favor of his own decision, declaring Duer's appeal to be lost. After many more motions, countermotions, and votes which ended all in the same manner as aforementioned, Leavenworth's original resolution was adopted with the vote of Peter Allen, and the casting vote of the Speaker. A new Council of Appointment was elected, the vote being: Darius Crosby 63; Archibald S. Clarke 62;  William Ross 61; Perley Keyes 61; Abraham Van Vechten 61; Gerrit Wendell 61; Henry Seymour 61 and Samuel G. Verbryck 47. Ross and Keyes were elected by the casting vote of the Speaker, resulting in the election of four Democratic-Republicans.

On February 6, the Assembly Committee on elections reported the abovementioned facts concerning the election of Peter Allen, and unanimously recommended that Fellows be seated instead of Allen. The Assembly concurred with a vote of 115 to 1, and Fellows was seated the next day, giving the Federalists now a majority of 1 after a Democratic-Republican Speaker, Clerk and Council of Appointment had been elected.

On April 17, 1816, a new Erie Canal Commission was appointed: Commissioners Stephen Van Rensselaer and DeWitt Clinton remained in office; and Samuel Young, Assemblyman Myron Holley and Joseph Ellicott were added. Later this day the Legislature adjourned.

State Senate
Under the re-apportionment of April 17, 1815, the State senators already in office and the senators elected at the last election should represent the District in which they resided. Thus the senators, when taking their seats at the next session in January 1816, were grouped as the table shows below. This led to a different number of seats per district as apportioned, which was corrected at the next election.

Districts
The Southern District (6 seats) consisted of Dutchess, Kings, New York, Putnam, Queens, Richmond, Rockland, Suffolk and Westchester counties.
The Middle District (8 seats) consisted of Albany, Chenango, Columbia, Delaware, Greene, Orange, Otsego, Schoharie, Sullivan and Ulster counties.
The Eastern District (10 seats) consisted of Clinton, Essex, Franklin, Herkimer, Jefferson, Lewis, Montgomery, Rensselaer,  St. Lawrence, Saratoga, Schenectady, Warren and Washington counties.
The Western District (8 seats) consisted of Allegany, Broome, Cattaraugus, Cayuga, Chautauqua, Cortland, Genesee, Madison,  Niagara, Oneida, Onondaga, Ontario, Seneca, Steuben and Tioga counties.

Note: There are now 62 counties in the State of New York. The counties which are not mentioned in this list had not yet been established, or sufficiently organized, the area being included in one or more of the abovementioned counties.

Members
The asterisk (*) denotes members of the previous Legislature who continued in office as members of this Legislature. David Allen changed from the Assembly to the Senate.

Employees
Clerk: John F. Bacon

State Assembly

Districts

Albany County (4 seats)
Allegany and Steuben counties (2 seats)
Broome County (1 seat)
Cattaraugus, Chautauqua and Niagara counties (2 seats)
Cayuga County (4 seats)
Chenango County (3 seats)
Clinton and Franklin counties (1 seat)
Columbia County (4 seats)
Cortland County (1 seat)
Delaware County (2 seats)
Dutchess County (5 seats)
Essex County (1 seat)
Genesee County (3 seats)
Greene County (2 seats)
Herkimer County (3 seats)
Jefferson County (2 seats)
Kings County (1 seat)
Lewis County (1 seat)
Madison County (3 seats)
Montgomery County (5 seats)
The City and County of New York (11 seats)
Oneida County (5 seats)
Onondaga County (4 seats)
Ontario County (7 seats)
Orange County (4 seats)
Otsego County (5 seats)
Putnam County (1 seat)
Queens County (3 seats)
Rensselaer County (5 seats)
Richmond County (1 seat)
Rockland County (1 seat)
St. Lawrence County (1 seat)
Saratoga County (4 seats)
Schenectady County (2 seats)
Schoharie County (3 seats)
Seneca County (3 seats)
Suffolk County (3 seats)
Sullivan and Ulster counties (4 seats)
Tioga County (1 seat)
Warren and Washington counties (5 seats)
Westchester County (3 seats)

Note: There are now 62 counties in the State of New York. The counties which are not mentioned in this list had not yet been established, or sufficiently organized, the area being included in one or more of the abovementioned counties.

Assemblymen
The asterisk (*) denotes members of the previous Legislature who continued as members of this Legislature.

Employees
Clerk: Aaron Clark
Sergeant-at-Arms: Thomas Donnelly
Doorkeeper: Benjamin Whipple

Notes

Sources
The New York Civil List compiled by Franklin Benjamin Hough (Weed, Parsons and Co., 1858) [see pg. 108f for Senate districts; pg. 122 for senators; pg. 148f for Assembly districts; pg. 190f for assemblymen]
The History of Political Parties in the State of New-York, from the Ratification of the Federal Constitution to 1840 by Jabez D. Hammond (4th ed., Vol. 1, H. & E. Phinney, Cooperstown, 1846; pages 401-428)
Election result Assembly, Albany Co. at project "A New Nation Votes", compiled by Phil Lampi, hosted by Tufts University Digital Library
Election result Assembly, Broome Co. at project "A New Nation Votes"
Election result Assembly, Cattaraugus, Chautauqua and Niagara Co. at project "A New Nation Votes"
Election result Assembly, Cayuga Co. at project "A New Nation Votes"
Election result Assembly, Clinton and Franklin Co. at project "A New Nation Votes"
Election result Assembly, Cortland Co. at project "A New Nation Votes"
Election result Assembly, Dutchess Co. at project "A New Nation Votes"
Election result Assembly, Essex Co. at project "A New Nation Votes"
Election result Assembly, Genesee Co. at project "A New Nation Votes"
Election result Assembly, Greene Co. at project "A New Nation Votes"
Election result Assembly, Herkimer Co. at project "A New Nation Votes"
Election result Assembly, Kings Co. at project "A New Nation Votes"
Election result Assembly, Onondaga Co. at project "A New Nation Votes"
Election result Assembly, Queens Co. at project "A New Nation Votes"
Election result Assembly, Rensselaer Co. at project "A New Nation Votes"
Election result Assembly, Richmond Co. at project "A New Nation Votes"
Election result Assembly, Rockland Co. at project "A New Nation Votes"
Election result Assembly, Schenectady Co. at project "A New Nation Votes"
Election result Assembly, Westchester Co. at project "A New Nation Votes" [gives wrong result]
Election result Senate, Southern D. at project "A New Nation Votes"
Election result Senate, Middle D. at project "A New Nation Votes"
Election result Senate, Eastern D. at project "A New Nation Votes"
Election result Senate, Western D. at project "A New Nation Votes"
Election result, Speaker at project "A New Nation Votes" [gives wrong party affiliations]
Election result, Assembly Clerk at project "A New Nation Votes"

039
1815 in New York (state)
1816 in New York (state)
1815 U.S. legislative sessions
1815